Hamerlinck or Haemerlinck is a Flemish surname. Notable people with the surname include:

Alfred Haemerlinck (1905–1993), Belgian road bicycle racer
Shawn Hamerlinck (born 1980), American politician

Dutch-language surnames